Uni Island is an island located in Tsushima, Nagasaki Prefecture, Japan, on the border between Japan and South Korea. The entire territory of Uni Island is state-owned land, and the Air Self-Defense Force is stationed on the island (the unit is the 19th Vigilance Team of the Western Air Vigilance Control Regiment under the Western Air Front). Therefore, except for military personnel, the rest of the personnel are not allowed to set foot on the island. Although there are no residential buildings on the island, Haikuri Island is not an uninhabited island because the Ministry of Defense has a government building. In the village of Crocodyura near Tsushima Island, a festival called the itobatago Festival, during which villagers are allowed to visit the island to participate in the event, and local ferries are commissioned by the Self-Defense Forces to transport the crew three times a day.

The origin of the island's name comes from the fact that many sea urchins settle around the island as the name Uni means sea urchin in Japanese.

History 
 In 1903, the Imperial Japanese Army Ministry established a radio base on Uni Island.
 In 1935, the Uni Island Battery was completed, and the island served as a military base until the end of World War II. After the war it was handed over to the private sector for use as agricultural land.
 In February 1955, Unit 9056 of the Western Training Vigilance Team of the Japan Air Self-Defense Force was formed in Fukuoka City.
 In April 1956, the guard was relocated to Uni Island and began military cooperation with the U.S. Department of Defense and the Air Department.
 In July 1961, the 19th Alert Group of the Western Air Alert Control Regiment of the Japan Air Self-Defense Force was changed to the 19th Alert Group.
 In March 2003, it was reorganized into the 19th Vigilance Squad.

Geography 
Located at the northernmost tip of Tsushima in Nagasaki Prefecture, Japan, the island is only  in a straight line from South Korea. The transportation of Kaikuri Island is very inconvenient, and there is no bridge connecting it to the main island of Tsushima.

Climate 
Uni Island has a humid subtropical climate (Köppen climate classification Cfa.

References

Coordinates on Wikidata
Infobox mapframe without OSM relation ID on Wikidata
Japan Air Self-Defense Force bases
Islands of Nagasaki Prefecture
Islands of the Sea of Japan
CS1 uses Japanese-language script (ja)